Diodorus Siculus was a 1st-century BC Greek historian who wrote the Bibliotheca historica.

Diodorus may also refer to:

 Diodorus of Aspendus, (4th century BC), Pythagorean philosopher
 Diodorus Cronus (died c. 284 BC), Greek philosopher
 Diodorus, son of Xenophon (c. 431 BC–c. 354 BC)
 Diodorus of Tyre (2nd century BC), Peripatetic philosopher
 Diodorus of Adramyttium (1st century BC), rhetorician and Academic philosopher
 Diodorus Pasparus (fl. 69 BC), Pergamene statesman
 Diodorus of Alexandria or Diodorus Alexandrinus (1st century BC), astronomer 
 Diodorus of Tarsus (died c. 390), Christian bishop, monastic reformer, and theologian
 Patriarch Diodoros of Jerusalem (1923–2000), Patriarch of Jerusalem in the Eastern Orthodox Church
 Diodorus (genus), a genus of silesaurid dinosauriform